thumb|250px|Crest of the Heerlijkheid Oosterland
Bonifacius de Jonge, Heer of Oosterland and Heer-Jansland in Zeeland (Zierikzee, 1567 – Middelburg, June 1625) was raadpensionaris of Zeeland province in the Dutch Republic between 1615 and 1625.

Career
De Jonge was the eldest son of Jan de Jonge van Oosterland, burgemeester of the city of Zierikzee, and Cornelia Boenze. He first became pensionary of his native city and was appointed Secretary of the States of Zeeland on 24 March 1599. He was raadpensionaris of Zeeland from 18 February 1615 until his death in 1625.

Personal life
De Jonge was married several times:
Maria Stavenisse (1587 - 1591)
Dina de Huybert (1595 - 1601)
Catharina Winckelman (1603; she survived him by 22 years)
He had many children. Among his descendants are Bonifacius Cornelis de Jonge and Johannes Cornelis de Jonge

References
Aa, A.J. van der, Jonge, Bonifacius de in: Biographisch woordenboek der Nederlanden, bevattende levensbeschrijvingen van zoodanige personen, die zich op eenigerlei wijze in ons vaderland hebben vermaard gemaakt, Volume 19 (1878), p. 180

1567 births
1625 deaths
Zeeland politicians
People of the Dutch Republic
Political history of the Dutch Republic
Grand Pensionaries
People from Zierikzee